The Roman Catholic Church in the Caribbean comprises thirteen ecclesiastical provinces — each headed by a metropolitan archbishop — plus one diocese that is part of a non-Caribbean province. Each province has an archdiocese (headed by an archbishop) and one or more suffragan dioceses (headed by a bishop). Each diocesan bishop, coadjutor bishop, and auxiliary bishop — active and retired — belongs to one of the episcopal conferences listed below.

There are also 2 Mission sui iuris in the Caribbean. All of those listed are members of the Antilles Episcopal Conference, including three, the Diocese of Georgetown, Diocese of Cayenne and the Diocese of Paramaribo which are located in South America in the dependencies Guyana, French Guiana, and Suriname respectively. Also a member of the Antilles Conference is the Diocese of Belize City-Belmopan on the mainland in Belize.

Each of the Greater Antilles — Haiti, Cuba, the Dominican Republic and Puerto Rico — has its own conference. An exception is the Diocese of Saint Thomas in the United States Virgin Islands, whose bishop is a member of the United States Conference of Catholic Bishops and an Observer to the Antilles Conference.

Antilles Episcopal Conference

Ecclesiastical province of Castries 
 Archdiocese of Castries
 Diocese of Kingstown
  Diocese of Roseau
  Diocese of Saint George's in Grenada
  Diocese of Saint John's - Basseterre

Ecclesiastical province of Fort-de-France 
 Archdiocese of Fort-de-France
 Diocese of Basse-Terre

Ecclesiastical province of Kingston in Jamaica 
 Archdiocese of Kingston in Jamaica
 Diocese of Mandeville
 Diocese of Montego Bay
 Mission Sui Iuris of Cayman Islands

Ecclesiastical province of Nassau 
 Archdiocese of Nassau
 Diocese of Hamilton in Bermuda
 Mission Sui Iuris of Turks and Caicos

Ecclesiastical province of Port of Spain 
 Archdiocese of Port of Spain
 Diocese of Bridgetown
 Diocese of Willemstad

Episcopal Conference of Cuba

Ecclesiastical province of San Cristobal de la Habana 
 Archdiocese of San Cristobal de la Habana
 Diocese of Matanzas
 Diocese of Pinar del Rio

Ecclesiastical province of Santiago de Cuba 
 Archdiocese of Santiago de Cuba
 Diocese of Guantánamo-Baracoa
 Diocese of Holguín
 Diocese of Santisimo Salvador de Bayamo y Manzanillo

Ecclesiastical province of Camagüey 
 Archdiocese of Camagüey
 Diocese of Ciego de Avila
 Diocese of Cienfuegos
 Diocese of Santa Clara

Episcopal Conference of the Dominican Republic

Ecclesiastical province of Santo Domingo 
 Archdiocese of Santo Domingo
 Diocese of Baní
 Diocese of Barahona
 Diocese of Nuestra Señora de la Altagracia en Higüey
 Diocese of San Juan de la Maguana
 Diocese of San Pedro de Macorís

Ecclesiastical province of Santiago de los Caballeros 
 Archdiocese of Santiago de los Caballeros
 Diocese of La Vega
 Diocese of Mao-Monte Cristi
 Diocese of Puerto Plata
 Diocese of San Francisco de Macorís

Episcopal Conference of Haiti

Ecclesiastical province of Cap-Haïtien 
 Archdiocese of Cap-Haïtien
 Diocese of Fort-Liberté
 Diocese of Granada
 Diocese of Hinche
 Diocese of Les Gonaïves
 Diocese of Port-de-Paix

Ecclesiastical province of Port-au-Prince 
 Archdiocese of Port-au-Prince
 Diocese of Jacmel
 Diocese of Jérémie
 Diocese of Les Cayes

Puerto Rican Episcopal Conference
The Metropolitan Province of San Juan de Puerto Rico comprises the United States Commonwealth of Puerto Rico. (The bishops of the province form their own episcopal conference, the Conferencia Episcopal Puertorriqueña.)

Ecclesiastical Province of San Juan de Puerto Rico
See: List of the Catholic bishops of the United States#Province of San Juan de Puerto Rico
Archdiocese of San Juan de Puerto Rico
Diocese of Arecibo
Diocese of Caguas
Diocese of Fajardo-Humacao
Diocese of Mayagüez
Diocese of Ponce

United States Conference of Catholic Bishops

Ecclesiastical Province of Washington
Diocese of St. Thomas

Footnotes

References
Antilles Statistics

Catholic Church in the Caribbean

Caribbean